Styphelia triflora, commonly known as pink five-corners, is a flowering plant in the heath family Ericaceae. It is an erect, spreading shrub with broad leaves with a spiky tip, and usually pink tubular flowers with the petals rolled back revealing the fluffy insides. It is found in New South Wales and Queensland growing on loam or sandy soils.

Description
The flowers are tube-shaped, pendulous or spreading, mostly pink to red, sometimes light yellow-green or cream. Flowering occurs mostly between April and October.

Taxonomy and naming
Styphelia triflora was first formally described in 1799 by Henry Cranke Andrews and the description was published in The Botanist's Repository for New, and Rare Plants. The specific epithet (triflora) means "three flowered".

Distribution and habitat
Pink five-corners is a widespread species in New South Wales, growing in woodlands and open sclerophyll forests on moist sandy soils or loams including coastal areas north of Jervis Bay and the  upper Blue Mountains.

References

triflora
Flora of New South Wales
Flora of Queensland
Taxa named by Henry Cranke Andrews